Ja'Sir Taylor (born January 8, 1999) is an American football cornerback for the Los Angeles Chargers of the National Football League (NFL). He played college football at Wake Forest and was drafted by the Chargers in the sixth round of the 2022 NFL Draft.

College career
Raised in Brick Township, New Jersey, Taylor was ranked as a threestar recruit by 247Sports.com coming out of Brick Township High School. He committed to Wake Forest on January 19, 2017, over an offer from Temple.

Professional career
Taylor was drafted by the Los Angeles Chargers with the 214th pick in the sixth round of the 2022 NFL Draft.

References

External links
 Los Angeles Chargers bio
 Wake Forest Demon Deacons bio

Living people
1999 births
American football cornerbacks
Brick Township High School alumni
Wake Forest Demon Deacons football players
Los Angeles Chargers players
Players of American football from New Jersey
Sportspeople from Monmouth County, New Jersey
Sportspeople from Ocean County, New Jersey
People from Asbury Park, New Jersey
People from Brick Township, New Jersey